The Salsbury Row House is located in Eau Claire, Wisconsin. It was added to the National Register of Historic Places in 2009.

History
The house was built for James F. Salsbury. It was then owned by brother and sister William and Mae Kelley in the early part of the 20th century.

References

Houses on the National Register of Historic Places in Wisconsin
Houses in Eau Claire, Wisconsin
Houses completed in 1891
National Register of Historic Places in Eau Claire County, Wisconsin
Queen Anne architecture in Wisconsin